Ṣafī al-Dīn Muḥammad ibn ʿAlī ibn al-Ṭabāṭabā (1262– 1309) also known as Ibn al-Tiqtaqa, was a historian and naqib of Alids in Ḥilla.

He was a direct descendant of Ḥasan ibn Ali ibn Abi Ṭalib. According to E.G. Browne's English version Of Mīrzā Muhammad b. ‛Abudi’l-Wahhāb-i—Qazwīni's edition of ‛Alā-ad-Dīn ‛Ata Malik-i-Juwaynī's Ta’rīhh-i-Jahān Gushā (London1912, Luzac), p.ix, Ibn al-Tiqtaqā's name was Safiyu’d-Din Muhammad ibn ‛Ali ibn Muhammad ibn Tabātabā.

Around 1302 AD he wrote a popular compendium of Islamic history called al-Fakhri. 

According to the political scientist Vasileios Syros, the philosophy of ibn al-Ṭabāṭabā can be compared to that of Niccolò Machiavelli.

References 

Encyclopedia of Islam, vol. ii, (Leiden 1927, Brill), pp. 423–4.
 Note by Professor H. A. R. Gibb, in Arnold J. Toynbee's A Study of History

1262 births
1310 deaths
Iraqi Shia Muslims
13th-century Arabs